This is a list of Sinn Féin MPs.  It includes all Members of Parliament elected to the British House of Commons representing Sinn Féin.  Members of the European Parliament, Dáil Éireann or the Northern Ireland Assembly are not listed.  Sinn Féin MPs practice abstentionism regarding the House of Commons and thus do not take their seats.

MPs elected since 1918
Gerry Adams, Belfast West, 1983–1992, 1997–2011
Órfhlaith Begley, West Tyrone, 2018–present
Mickey Brady, Newry and Armagh, 2015–present
Owen Carron, Fermanagh and South Tyrone, 1982-1983 ¹
Philip Clarke, Fermanagh and South Tyrone, 1955 ²
Pat Doherty, West Tyrone, 2001–2017
John Finucane, Belfast North, 2019–present
Michelle Gildernew, Fermanagh and South Tyrone, 2001–2015; 2017–present
Chris Hazzard, South Down, 2017–present
Elisha McCallion, Foyle, 2017–2019
Barry McElduff, West Tyrone, 2017–2018
Martin McGuinness, Mid Ulster, 1997–2013
Paul Maskey, Belfast West, 2011–present
Tom Mitchell, Mid Ulster, 1955 ²
Francie Molloy, Mid Ulster, 2013–present
Conor Murphy, Newry and Armagh, 2005–2015

¹ Elected in 1981 as "Anti H-Block/Proxy Political Prisoner"; formally began describing himself as a Sinn Féin MP in 1982.
² Unseated on petition.

Graphical representation

MPs elected in 1918
In alphabetical order:

 By-elections was not called to fill the seats of those MP's who died before the 1922 UK general election, nor in the cases of individuals elected for more than one constituency.

MPs elected 1917–1918 (before the 1918 general election)
In chronological order:

References

Westminster Representatives

 
Sinn Fein
Sinn Fein MPs
Sinn Fein